Ghiyas-ud-din Jahangir Mirza (1356 – 1376) was a member of the Timurid dynasty and a son of its founder, the Central Asian conqueror Timur. He was Timur's favourite son and served as one of his military commanders as well as his heir apparent. However, Jahangir died in 1376, predeceasing his father by almost thirty years.

Birth
Jahangir was one of four sons of Timur who survived infancy and the only one born of a free wife. His mother Turmish Agha also gave birth to two other children; Jahanshah, who died young and a daughter, Aka Biki, who was the mother of Sultan Husayn Tayichiud.

There is some disagreement regarding whether Jahangir or his brother Umar Shaikh was the eldest of Timur's sons. The Mu’izz al-Ansab (The Glorifier of Genealogies), the most important source regarding the structure of the Timurid royal family during this period, is contradictory on this point. It states that Jahangir was the eldest, but the family of Umar Shaikh is presented first in the genealogy itself, implying that the latter was born first. Narrative sources, such as the Zafarnama by Nizam al-Din Shami, and Yazdi's book of the same name support the notion that Jahangir was younger.

War with Moghulistan
Following the death of Tughlugh Timur, the Khan of the Chagatai Khanate, control of the eastern half of his territory (an area termed Moghulistan) was seized by a noble named Qamar-ud-din Dughlat. Taking advantage of the disorder, Timur, who had already conquered the western half of the khanate, led an expedition against Dughlat in 1370. By 1375, Dughlat was in continual retreat from Timur and had sheltered in the Kök-tepe Mountains. Jahangir was sent to pursue the noble through the narrow gorges between the peaks, defeating various Mongol detachments in the region along the way. Though Dughlat himself eluded capture, Jahangir was able to capture his wife, Tuman Agha, and daughter, Dilshad Agha. The latter of the two was married to Timur soon after.

Marriage
In 1372, Timur launched an invasion of the former Chagatai territory of Khorasan, then under the control of the Sufi dynasty. Though initially defiant, the ruler of the kingdom, Yusuf Sufi, eventually submitted and offered his niece Khanzada Begum in marriage to Jahangir. Khanzada was the daughter of Yusuf's brother Aq Sufi by Shakar Beg, a daughter of Jani Beg, Khan of the Golden Horde.

The following year, Khanzada was sent to Timur's capital of Samarqand with a large procession carrying gifts, including gems, precious metals, silks and tapestries. She was escorted by a retinue of handmaidens and mounted soldiers, while she herself rode veiled on a white camel.

Jahangir had a son and a daughter by this marriage, Muhammad Sultan Mirza and Yadigar Sultan.

Death

Jahangir died of illness only two years after his marriage in 1376. Timur was reportedly inconsolable by his son's death, which caused a hiatus in his otherwise continuous military campaigns. Yazdi states that "Everything then became melancholy and disagreeable to him and his cheeks were almost always bathed in tears; he clothed himself with mourning, and his life became uneasy to him. The whole kingdom, which used to be overjoyed at the arrival of this great emperor, was turned into a place of sorrow and weeping."

He was buried in a tall edifice termed the "Tomb of Jahangir", part of the Dorussaodat mausoleum complex in modern-day Shahrisabz. Presently, the tomb is the best surviving part of the structure.

Family
Jahangir had six children by three wives:

By Khanzada Begum, daughter of Aq Sufi Qongirat
Muhammad Sultan Mirza
Yadigar Sultan
By Ruqayya Khanike, daughter of Amir Kai-Khusrau Apardi
Jahan Sultan
By Bakht Malik Agha, daughter of Ilyas Khwaja Tatar Yasauri
Pir Muhammad Mirza
Fatima Sultan
Payanda Sultan

References 

Timurid dynasty
1356 births
1376 deaths